"Kein Wort" is a song recorded by German-Moroccan rapper Juju and Swiss-Albanian rapper Loredana featuring German producers Miksu and Macloud. It was composed and produced by the aforementioned producers together with German composers Krutsch and Shucati.

Commercially, "Kein Wort" experienced success charting at number one in Austria and Germany becoming Juju's third and Loredana's second single to reach number one in both countries, respectively. An official music video for the song was shot by Fati.tv and was uploaded on 16 January 2020 to accompany the single's release. It portrays the rappers performing the song in different locations and ambiances.

Background

Composition
"Kein Wort" was announced to be released on 10 January 2020 through a post on the Instagram account of both rappers. It was solely written by Juju and Loredana and produced by the latters regular collaborators, German producers Macloud and Miksu alongside German composers Krutsch and Shucati. It was composed in  time and is performed in the key of F minor with a tempo of 160 beats per minute.

Promotion
"Kein Wort" was released on digital platforms and to streaming services as a single on 16 January 2020 through JINX Music. An accompanying music video was directed by Fati.tv and premiered on Loredana's YouTube channel on 16 January 2020, where it has since amassed a total of 37 million views.

Personnel
Credits adapted from Tidal and YouTube.

 Juju – performing, vocals, songwriting
 Loredana – performing, vocals, songwriting
 Laurin Auth (Macloud) – composition, production
 Joshua Allery (Miksu) – composition, production
 Krutsch – composition, production
 Shucati – composition
 Neslihan Degerli – styling
 Hakan Keppler – styling assisting
 Imke Rabiega – styling assisting
 Sellma Kasumovic – make-up
 Kaci Lleshi – hair styling

Charts

Weekly charts

Year-end charts

Certifications

Release history

See also
 List of number-one hits of 2020 (Austria)
 List of number-one hits of 2020 (Germany)

References

2020 singles
2020 songs
Loredana Zefi songs
German-language songs
Song recordings produced by Macloud
Song recordings produced by Miksu
Number-one singles in Austria
Number-one singles in Germany
Songs written by Loredana Zefi
Music videos directed by Fati.tv